Philipe Fidélis dos Santos (born 14 June 1989), or simply Fidélis, is a Brazilian professional footballer who plays as a striker for Emirati club Masafi.

Club career
Fidelis scored a memorable goal for Marítimo against English side Newcastle United in the Europa League group stage on 22 November 2012. Coming on in the 59th minute, Fidelis struck the equaliser for Maritimo 20 minutes later. He was unlucky not to score a winner in the last minute and the game ended 1–1.

References

External links
 
 

1989 births
Living people
People from Contagem
Sportspeople from Minas Gerais
Brazilian footballers
Association football forwards
C.S. Marítimo players
Portimonense S.C. players
F.C. Penafiel players
Ras Al Khaimah Club players
Al Dhaid SC players
Al-Taawon (UAE) Club players
Masafi Club players
Nejmeh SC players
Primeira Liga players
Liga Portugal 2 players
UAE First Division League players
Lebanese Premier League players
Brazilian expatriate footballers
Brazilian expatriate sportspeople in Portugal
Brazilian expatriate sportspeople in the Netherlands
Brazilian expatriate sportspeople in the United Arab Emirates
Brazilian expatriate sportspeople in Lebanon
Expatriate footballers in Portugal
Expatriate footballers in the Netherlands
Expatriate footballers in the United Arab Emirates
Expatriate footballers in Lebanon